The 1964–65 Egyptian Premier League, was the 15th season of the Egyptian Premier League, the top Egyptian professional league for association football clubs, since its establishment in 1948. The season started on 6 November 1964 and concluded on 11 June 1965.
Zamalek managed to win the league for the third time in the club's history.

League table

Group 1

 (C)= Champion, (R)= Relegated, Pld = Matches played; W = Matches won; D = Matches drawn; L = Matches lost; F = Goals for; A = Goals against; ± = Goal difference; Pts = Points.

Top goalscorers

Teams

References

External links 
 All Egyptian Competitions Info

5
1964–65 in African association football leagues
1964–65 in Egyptian football